Bogomil Pavlov, born 18 February 1992 is a Bulgarian ski jumper competing for Ski club Moten. Pavlov's best result so far is a 28th place in PyongChang and Alpensia Resort in Continental Cup 2009. Pavlov has also competed in some World Cup qualifications, but has never made it into the final.

External links
Pavlov's FIS Biography

Bulgarian male ski jumpers
Living people
Year of birth missing (living people)
Place of birth missing (living people)